Nurragi is a locality on Fleurieu Peninsula in South Australia. It was named for and served by the Nurragi railway station which in turn was derived from a native name for scrub. The station and railway alignment are now the Nurragi Conservation Reserve.

References

Towns in South Australia